Anwar Sardar "Anu" Malik (born 2 November 1960) is an Indian music composer, singer, music arranger and score composer. He is an Indian National Award and Filmfare Award winning musician, who primarily composes music for the Hindi film industry. He is the son of Sardar Malik.

As a music director, he has composed music for various genres of films, and has created several commercially successful songs for the Hindi (Bollywood) film music industry. Malik is also known for the use of the tabla in some of his songs, including "Taal Pe Jab"' and "Mere Humsafar" from the film Refugee, "Tumse Milke Dilka Jo Haal" from Main Hoon Na, "Eli Re Eli" from Yaadein and "Baazigar O Baazigar" from the film Baazigar. Malik's song "Chamma Chamma" from China Gate was used in the Hollywood film Moulin Rouge! starring Nicole Kidman.

Malik was a judge on Indian Idol from its first season in 2004 until 2018 when he left after "Me Too" allegation. He returned as a judge for the show's 11th season in 2019, but left after three weeks, and he was one of the judges for part of the 12th season. He is currently a judge for Sa Re Ga Ma Pa L'il Champs 2022.

Career

1974–1992: Early years and struggle phase
Malik began his career as a music director in 1974 by replacing his father Sardar Malik for comedian-turned-filmmaker Mohan Choti's film Hunterwali 77 (1977) with the stage name Annu Malik. The soundtrack went unnoticed but it marked the beginning of his lengthy association with Asha Bhosle, who recorded two songs for the soundtrack including "Zulm O Sitam Par Itrane Wale". He would then compose music for Harmesh Malhotra's subsequent films Poonam (1981), Aapas Ki Baat (1981) and Mangal Pandey (1982), as well as Paagal Premee (1982) and Ek Jaan Hai Hum (1983) but all these soundtracks went unnoticed and the films were box office failures. He gained his first exposure in 1984 with Aasmaan which featured catchy tracks such as "Banke Nazar Dil Ki Zubaan" rendered by Kishore Kumar and "Time Bomb" rendered by Asha Bhosle and Kishore Kumar, which received critical acclaim. His next soundtrack for the film Sohni Mahiwal released later that year was a huge success and earned him his first nomination for the Filmfare Award for Best Music Director.

Malik began getting more recognition and more work after his success in 1984 as he got more soundtracks throughout the mid-1980s but was unable to find a footing in Bollywood due to the rule of Bappi Lahiri, R.D. Burman, Kalyanji-Anandji and Laxmikant-Pyarelal at the time. Malik got his first mainstream breakthrough in 1985 with Manmohan Desai's film Mard which got Malik noticed in Bollywood for the first time. Malik introduced playback singer Mohammad Aziz in Mard and Aziz frequently collaborated with Malik in his various soundtracks. During this phase, his song "Apno Me Mai Begana" from Begaana became a hit and gained a cult following. In 1987, Malik began playback singing while recording a song "Julie Julie" for Jeete Hain Shaan Se when Kishore Kumar did not show up for recording the song. Kumar's son Amit Kumar was then called on for the song but he did not arrive as well and then the film's lead actor Mithun Chakraborty recommended Malik to sing the song. He recorded two more songs for the soundtrack, "Salaam Seth Salaam Seth" and "Rab Roothe Roothe". This soundtrack also marked the first time that he collaborated with Kumar Sanu to record a version of "Julie Julie" with Kavita Krishnamurthy which was not included in the film. However, it would lead to several collaborations with Sanu in the future. "Julie Julie" became a huge hit and the film emerged as a major success at the box office.

He had many soundtracks throughout the following years without much success. He earned acclaim for his music in Awaargi (1990) which featured the famous ghazal "Chamakte Chand Ko Toota Hua" sung by Ghulam Ali. Malik originally composed music in the same style as other music composers during the 1970s and 1980s.

However, in 1990, Malik began changing his music style on the recommendation of Anuradha Paudwal which would become his trademark style. Early songs in that trademark style included "Maa Hi Mandir" by Mohammad Aziz and the hit song "Aaine Ke Sau Tukde" by Kumar Sanu from Maa (1991), "Hum Nahin To Tum Nahin" and "Teri Zulfein Shaam Si Roshan" from Ramgarh Ke Sholay (1991), "Jaanam Jaanam Jaanam" from Virodhi (1992) and "Choone Se Tere" from Dil Ne Ikraar Kiya (1992). Other hit songs during that period included "Dil Diwane Ka Dola Dildaar Ke Liye" from Tahalka (1992) and "Is Pyar Se Meri Taraf Na Dekho" from Chamatkar (1992). It was during this era that he also modified his name to Anu Malik.

1993–2004: Domination of Bollywood music
The year 1993 marked a turning point in Malik's career as it was the most successful year of his career at that time. His first release that year was Phool Aur Angaar which was a huge success. Malik received his first taste of success with Mahesh Bhatt's television film Phir Teri Kahani Yaad Aayee which featured superhit songs including "Badalon Mein Chup Raha Hai", "Dil Mein Sanam Ki Soorat" and "Tere Dar Par Sanam Chale Aaye". The success of the film was followed by Bhatt's directorial Sir which had hit songs such as "Sun Sun Barsaat Ki Dhun" and "Yeh Ujli Chandni". His final release of that year was Baazigar which was a huge success with the songs "Baazigar O Baazigar", "Kitabein Bahut Si", 	"Chhupana Bhi Nahi Aata", "Aye Mere Humsafar" and most notably "Yeh Kaali Kaali Aankhein", for which Malik rapped a few lines. It sold 10million units and became the year's best selling soundtrack for Bollywood. It catapulted Malik into stardom and established him as one of the top music directors of Bollywood. Malik won his first Filmfare Award for Best Music Director for Baazigar at the 39th Filmfare Awards in 1994.

Malik would join Nadeem-Shravan and Jatin–Lalit as one of Bollywood's top music directors throughout the 1990s with popular and successful soundtracks such as Khuddar (1994), Imtihaan (1994), Aa Gale Lag Jaa (1994), Vijaypath (1994), Main Khiladi Tu Anari (1994), Naajayaz (1995), The Gambler (1995), Akele Hum Akele Tum (1995), Chaahat (1996), Diljale (1996), Khiladiyon Ka Khiladi (1996), Daraar (1996), Krishna (1996), Virasat (1997), Judwaa (1997), Border (1997), Ishq (1997), Ankhon Mein Tum Ho (1997), China Gate (1998), Soldier (1998), Hum Aapke Dil Mein Rehte Hain (1999), Jaanam Samjha Karo (1999), Biwi No.1 (1999), Haseena Maan Jaayegi (1999) and Baadshah (1999). He received further nominations for the Filmfare Award for Best Music Director for Main Khiladi Tu Anari, Akele Hum Akele Tum, Border, Soldier, Biwi No.1 and Haseena Maan Jaayegi during the decade.

Aside from composing, Malik lent his voice for his compositions on various occasions such as "Maari Gayi" from Jaanam (1992), "My Adorable Darling" and the rapping portion of "Main Khiladi Tu Anari" from Main Khiladi Tu Anari (1994) and "Oonchi Hai Building" and "East or West" from Judwaa (1997). He also released several albums in the Indipop genre which he sang by himself including Tera Chehra (1995), English album Eyes (1997), Lafda Na Ho Jaye (1997) and Ho Raha Hai Sama (1999).

Malik had major success in the year 2000 with best-selling soundtracks including Hera Pheri, Badal, Har Dil Jo Pyar Karega, Aaghaaz, Fiza, Josh and Refugee. His soundtrack for Refugee was critically acclaimed as he became the only music director to win the Filmfare Special Award for his compositions in the movie at the 46th Filmfare Awards. He also received the National Film Award for Best Music Direction for Refugee at the 48th National Film Awards. In 2001, Malik had best-selling albums with Chori Chori Chupke Chupke, Yaadein, Asoka, Lajja, Ajnabee and Mujhe Kucch Kehna Hai. His soundtrack for Mujhe Kucch Kehna Hai earned him his twelfth nomination for the Filmfare Award for Best Music Director and his soundtrack for Asoka earned him a nomination for the Screen Award for Best Music Director. His soundtracks during the year 2002 went unnoticed but he had a resurgence in 2003 with best-selling albums Ishq Vishk, Main Prem Ki Diwani Hoon, Khushi, Munnabhai MBBS and Inteha and LOC: Kargil. He received critical acclaim for LOC: Kargil, which earned him his thirteenth nomination for the Filmfare Award for Best Music Director and won him his first Screen Award for Best Music Direction.

Malik found success with successful best-selling soundtracks such as Main Hoon Na, Murder and Fida in 2004. His soundtrack for Main Hoon Na earned critical acclaim and won Malik his second Filmfare Award for Best Music Director, his second Screen Award for Best Music Director and his first Zee Cine Award for Best Music Director.

2005–present: Later career
The mid-2000s marked the rise of a new generation of music directors including A. R. Rahman, Himesh Reshammiya, Vishal–Shekhar, Pritam Chakraborty and Shankar–Ehsaan–Loy and the amount of Malik's work began reducing after 2005 and he accepted his new role as a regular judge on the reality singing competition show Indian Idol on Sony Entertainment Television, beginning with its first season in 2004. He received a nomination for the Screen Award for Best Music Director for Jaan-E-Mann (2006). The year 2007 marked for the first time since 1983 that Malik composed soundtrack for only one film Undertrial.

Malik remained prominent as a judge for various reality television shows but lost major offers as a music director in the coming years. His recent work includes Kambakkht Ishq (2009), Yamla Pagla Deewana (2011), Shootout at Wadala (2013), Dum Laga Ke Haisha (2015), Begum Jaan (2017) and Sui Dhaaga (2018). He won his second Zee Cine Award for Best Music Director for Dum Laga Ke Haisha, which marked his reunion with Kumar Sanu since No Entry (2005) as well as his first collaboration with Yash Raj Films.

Collaborations
Malik has worked with many Indian playback singers including Mohammed Rafi, Kishore Kumar, Asha Bhonsle, Amit Kumar, and others. During the '80s, he mostly worked with singers such as Mohammad Aziz, Shabbir Kumar, Manhar Udhas, Suresh Wadkar, Nitin Mukesh and Anwar.

Malik worked with Alisha Chinai to compose the commercially successful singles "Sexy Sexy" and "Ruk Ruk Ruk" from Vijaypath, "Chot Dil Pe Lagi" from Ishq Vishk and the songs from Love Story 2050. He also worked with Indian film lyricist Javed Akhtar in films including Border, Refugee and Umrao Jaan.

Kumar Sanu and Alka Yagnik have sung in most of the singles composed by Malik. This trio collaborated on films such as: Sir, Phool Aur Angaar, Phir Teri Kahani Yaad Aayee, Vijaypath, Baazigar, Main Khiladi Tu Anari, Imtihaan, Chamatkar, Gambler, Akele Hum Akele Tum, Duplicate, Kareeb, Soldier, Aarzoo, Ishq Vishk and Fida. Sanu and Yagnik were regular singers for Anu Malik and Malik created many songs individually with Sanu such as "Aaine Ke Sau Tukde" from Maa (1991) and the single "Yeh Kaali Kaali Aankhen" from Baazigar (1993).

Following the death of music director R. D. Burman, Malik has completed music for Burman's unfinished film projects 1942: A Love Story, Gang and Ghatak.

Television
Malik has been one of the judges on the TV show Indian Idol since the show's inception in 2004 until the format of the show changed into Indian Idol Junior in 2013. When Indian Idol returned in 2016 for its 9th season, Malik was again one of the judges, remaining until October 2018 when he left the show following allegations of sexual harassment. Malik returned as a judge in 2019 for the 11th season, but left the show again after three weeks. In the show's 12th season in 2021, Malik appeared as a guest in one episode, and later acted as a replacement judge when the regular judges had to isolate due to the covid-19 pandemic.

Farah Khan and Malik were the judges for Entertainment Ke Liye Kuch Bhi Karega, a variety entertainment reality show that airs on Sony Entertainment Television (India) on weekdays.

Malik was the only judge from India on Asian Idol, who represented Indian Idol winner Abhijeet Sawant, with other judges Indra Lesmana, Paul Moss, Pilita Corrales, Ken Lim and Siu Black.

Singer
Although he is not a mainstream singer, Malik does playback singing. Written off as a singer in his early days ("Julie Julie," for instance), he continues to sing his own compositions, with songs such as "Aaila Re" from the movie Jung, "Jaanam Samjha Karo" from Jaanam Samjha Karo, "Ek Garam Chaye ki Pyali" from the movie Har Dil Jo Pyar Karega, "Gori Gori" in Main Hoon Na or the recent "Meri Jane Jigar" in Deewane Huye Paagal. Among his works are "Oonchi Hai Building" and "East or West India is the best" from the movie Judwaa. and the rap part of "Yeh Kaali Kaali Aankhen" of Baazigar.

While he sings entire songs for some movies, especially those starring Sunil Shetty, Paresh Rawal, Akshay Kumar and Shahid Kapoor (in Deewane Huye Paagal he sang almost every song), and has also sung as part of a chorus in "Mehbooba Mehbooba" in the film Ajnabee, and "Tumse Milke Dilka Jo Haal" for Main Hoon Na.

Personal life
Malik is married to Anjali Vasudev Bhat and has two daughters Anmol Malik and Ada Malik.

Controversies

Plagiarism
Malik has faced criticism for using music written by other composers, for instance in the film The Gentleman where the music of several songs credited to Malik was written by A. R. Rahman, and  "Mera Piya Ghar Aaya" in Yaarana which was allegedly identical to a song by the same name written by Pakistani Qawwali musician Nusrat Fateh Ali Khan (1948–1997). Khan was reportedly tolerant towards Bollywood music directors plagiarising his songs, but disapproved strongly of Malik's using the music of a song which originally had a religious theme as a secular love song. According to Khan, Malik had repeatedly said to him that he loved his music and was actually showing admiration by using his tunes, and in an interview for IANS Malik dismissed all plagiarism allegations, saying that "no one in this world is original" and claiming that all similarities are due to there being "just seven notes in music".

Sexual harassment
In October 2018, in the wake of the MeToo movement in India, Malik was accused of sexual harassment by several women in separate claims. One accusation came from singer Shweta Pandit, who said he had made an unwanted sexual pass at her when she was 15 years old. Lyricist Sameer came out in his support, saying that he was present during the audition where the harassment of Pandit was claimed to have happened. Sona Mohapatra and Neha Bhasin also accused Malik of predatory behaviour. Malik denied the allegations, but the public backlash resulted in him leaving as a judge for season 10 of Indian Idol. Alisha Chinai, who had sued Malik for molestation in the 1990s, supported the allegations. Sonu Nigam also came out in support of Malik, claiming that he had not seen any proof that the allegations were true. In 2019, Malik was reinstated as a judge on Season 11 of Indian Idol, a decision that resulted in heavy criticism. Malik stepped down, claiming that he had decided to take a break as he was unable to focus on his work on the show. On 17 January 2020, National Commission for Women closed the sexual harassment case on Anu Malik due to lack of substantial evidence, but clarifying that it could be reopened if evidence is provided. Sona Mohapatra criticised the commission's decision.

Awards and nominations 
Malik was awarded a Silver Lotus for J.P. Dutta's Refugee and the Filmfare Special Jury Award. He also won the Filmfare Award for Best Music Director for Main Hoon Na and Baazigar.

He is a seven-time winner from 42 nominations for best music director, including 14 nominations for the Filmfare Award for Best Music Director.

National Film Award

Filmfare Awards
 1994 – Winner, Filmfare Award for Best Music Director – Baazigar
 2001 – Winner, Filmfare Special Award – Refugee
 2005 – Winner, Filmfare Award for Best Music Director – Main Hoon Na
 1985 – Nominated, Filmfare Award for Best Music Director – Sohni Mahiwal
 1995 – Nominated, Filmfare Award for Best Music Director – Main Khiladi Tu Anari
 1996 – Nominated, Filmfare Award for Best Music Director – Akele Hum Akele Tum
 1998 – Nominated, Filmfare Award for Best Music Director – Virasat
 1998 – Nominated, Filmfare Award for Best Music Director – Border
 1999 – Nominated, Filmfare Award for Best Music Director – Soldier
 2000 – Nominated, Filmfare Award for Best Music Director – Biwi No.1
 2000 – Nominated, Filmfare Award for Best Music Director – Haseena Maan Jaayegi
 2001 – Nominated, Filmfare Award for Best Music Director – Fiza
 2001 – Nominated, Filmfare Award for Best Music Director – Josh
 2002 – Nominated, Filmfare Award for Best Music Director – Mujhe Kucch Kehna Hai
 2002 – Nominated, Filmfare Award for Best Music Director – Aśoka
 2004 – Nominated, Filmfare Award for Best Music Director – LOC: Kargil
 2005 – Nominated, Filmfare Award for Best Music Director – Murder
Zee Cine Awards
 2005 – Winner, Zee Cine Award for Best Music Director – Main Hoon Na
 2016 – Winner, Zee Cine Award for Best Music Director – Dum Laga Ke Haisha
 1998 – Nominated, Zee Cine Award for Best Music Director – Border
 1999 – Nominated, Zee Cine Award for Best Music Director – Soldier
 2000 – Nominated, Zee Cine Award for Best Music Director – Biwi No.1
 2000 – Nominated, Zee Cine Award for Best Music Director – Haseena Maan Jaayegi
 2001 – Nominated, Zee Cine Award for Best Music Director – Fiza
 2001 – Nominated, Zee Cine Award for Best Music Director – Refugee
 2002 – Nominated, Zee Cine Award for Best Music Director – Aśoka
 2004 – Nominated, Zee Cine Award for Best Music Director – LOC: Kargil
Star Screen Awards
 2005 – Winner, Star Screen Award for Best Music Director – Main Hoon Na
 2004 – Winner, Star Screen Special Tribute Award – Artist of the Decade
 1995 – Nominated, Star Screen Award for Best Music Director – Main Khiladi Tu Anari
 1996 – Nominated, Star Screen Award for Best Music Director – Akele Hum Akele Tum
 1998 – Nominated, Star Screen Award for Best Music Director – Border
 1999 – Nominated, Star Screen Award for Best Music Director – Soldier
 2000 – Nominated, Star Screen Award for Best Music Director – Biwi No.1
 2000 – Nominated, Star Screen Award for Best Music Director – Haseena Maan Jaayegi
 2001 – Nominated, Star Screen Award for Best Music Director – Fiza
 2001 – Nominated, Star Screen Award for Best Music Director – Refugee
 2002 – Nominated, Star Screen Award for Best Music Director – Aśoka
 2004 – Nominated, Star Screen Award for Best Music Director – LOC: Kargil
 2004 – Nominated, Star Screen Award for Best Music Director – Munna Bhai M.B.B.S.
 2005 – Nominated, Star Screen Award for Best Music Director – Mujhse Shaadi Karogi
 2007 – Nominated, Star Screen Award for Best Music Director – Jaan-E-Mann
International Indian Film Academy Awards – Anu Malik has the highest nominations (7) without a win
 2005 – Nominated, IIFA Award for Best Music Director – Murder
 2005 – Nominated, IIFA Award for Best Music Director – Main Hoon Na
 2004 – Nominated, IIFA Award for Best Music Director – LOC: Kargil
 2004 – Nominated, IIFA Award for Best Music Director – Munna Bhai M.B.B.S.
 2002 – Nominated, IIFA Award for Best Music Director – Mujhe Kuch Kehna Hai
 2001 – Nominated, IIFA Award for Best Music Director – Fiza
 2001 – Nominated, IIFA Award for Best Music Director – Josh
Other
 2005 – Winner, Popular Award – Best Music Director for Main Hoon Na (2004)
 2010 – Winner, Asha Bhosle Award – Outstanding Contribution in Music
 2010 – Winner, Indian Telly Awards – Best reality show judge
 2014 – Winner, Giants International Awards – Lifetime Achievement in Music
 2015 – Winner, Big Star Entertainment Awards – 92.7 BIG FM – Suhana Safar Music Award

Discography

References

External links

 
 Anu Malik Official Website

Living people
Bollywood playback singers
Filmfare Awards winners
Indian film score composers
Mithibai College alumni
Best Music Direction National Film Award winners
Indian Muslims
People involved in plagiarism controversies
Film producers from Mumbai
20th-century Indian composers
21st-century Indian composers
Musicians from Mumbai
People from Kapurthala
1960 births
Indian male film score composers
20th-century Indian male singers
20th-century Indian singers
21st-century Indian male singers
21st-century Indian singers